Bob Reade (July 22, 1932 – July 5, 2020) was an American football coach. He served as the head coach at Augustana College in Rock Island, Illinois from 1979 to 1994, compiling a record of 146–23–1. His Augustana Vikings won four consecutive NCAA Division III Football Championships from 1983 and 1986 and were runners-up in 1982. Reade's teams went unbeaten for 60 straight games (59 wins, one tie) between the start of the 1983 season and the second round of the 1987 NCAA Division III playoffs, when Augustana lost to Dayton, 38–36. This remains the record for the longest unbeaten streak in NCAA Division III football history. Reade's teams won or shared 12 College Conference of Illinois and Wisconsin championships and he was named conference Coach of the Year nine times (1981, 1983–1987, 1990, 1993–1994). This award is now named in his honor. Reade was inducted into the College Football Hall of Fame as a coach in 1998.

Playing career
Reade played football as a linebacker at Cornell College in Mount Vernon, Iowa, from which he graduated in 1954.

Coaching career
Reade was the head football coach at J. D. Darnall High School in Geneseo, Illinois from 1962 to 1978, compiling a record of 146–21–4.  In 1979, Reade was hired at Augustana College, an NCAA Division III school in Rock Island, Illinois. He retired in 1994 with 146 wins and 11 playoff appearances at Augustana.

Honors
Reade was a recipient of the Amos Alonzo Stagg Award and was inducted into the College Football Hall of Fame in 1998.
In 1993, Reade authored a booked titled Coaching Football Successfully, for which Penn State's Joe Paterno wrote the foreword.

Death
Reade died on July 5, 2020.

Head coaching record

College

References

External links
 

1932 births
2020 deaths
Augustana (Illinois) Vikings football coaches
Cornell Rams football players
High school football coaches in Illinois
College Football Hall of Fame inductees
People from Monticello, Iowa
Coaches of American football from Iowa
Players of American football from Iowa